Dallas Historic District is a national historic district located at Dallas, Gaston County, North Carolina.  It encompasses eight contributing buildings surrounding the courthouse square and dated between about 1840 and 1900. Dallas served as the county seat of Gaston County from 1847 to 1911.  They are the Greek Revival style old Gaston County Courthouse, which now functions as the Dallas Town Hall; the county jail; the Hoffman Hotel; the Rhyne Store; the Smyre-Pasour House; the Matthews Hotel; the Late Victorian style Wilson-Spargo House; and the Setzer General Store.

The district was listed on the National Register of Historic Places in 1973.

Gallery

References

Historic districts on the National Register of Historic Places in North Carolina
Greek Revival architecture in North Carolina
Victorian architecture in North Carolina
Buildings and structures in Gaston County, North Carolina
National Register of Historic Places in Gaston County, North Carolina